Shadi Abdel Salam was an Egyptian film director, screenwriter and costume and set designer.

Early life and education
Born in Alexandria on 15 March 1930, Shadi graduated from Victoria College, Alexandria, 1948, and then moved to England to study theater arts from 1949 to 1950. He then joined faculty of fine arts in Cairo where he graduated as an architect in 1955. He worked as assistant to the artistic architect, Ramsis W. Wassef, 1957, and designed the decorations and costumes of some of the most famous historical Egyptian films among which are; Wa Islamah, Maww’ed fil Bourg, Al Nasser Salah Ad-Din, Almaz wa Abdu El Hamouly. He worked as a historical consultant and supervisor of the decoration, costumes and accessories sections of the Polish film, Pharaoh, directed by Jerzy Kawalerowicz.

He also directed the long drama film entitled The Night of Counting the Years (Al-Momiaa), 1968–1969, and he received many film awards for this work. Also directed the Ancient Egyptian short drama film entitled The Eloquent Peasant. Notably, he once worked as the Director of the Ministry of Culture Center for experimental films in 1970. He also wrote the scenario of the long drama film entitled "Ikhnatoun" and finalized the relevant designs from 1974–1985. He has taught at the Cinema Higher Institute of Egypt in the Departments of Decorations, Costumes and Film Direction from 1963–1969. He died on 8 October 1986.

Films

The Night of Counting the Years
The Night of Counting the Years was released in 1969. The story is based upon the true story of the discovery of 40 Royal Mummies in 1881 in Thebes, the capital of the Pharaonic Empire. For over three thousand years, the mummies had lain undisturbed, until some archaeologists from the Antiquities Department in Cairo noticed that several objects bearing royal names from the 21st dynasty were constantly appearing on the antique black market. They surmise that somewhere in Thebes, someone knows the location of the missing tombs. It happens that this secret has been kept from generation to generation by the chief's descendants among the Horabat mountain tribe. These people have always considered the Royal Cache to be a private source of income on which to draw at times of need. The money had then been divided among the members of the tribe. When the archaeologists arrive to find the tombs, the two sons of the dead tribal chief are thrown into moral chaos, not knowing whether to reveal the secret or preserve what the tribesmen consider to be their natural heritage. The younger son, Waniss, becomes the central figure in the story film.

The Eloquent Peasant
Produced in 1969, the short film is based upon the ancient tale of the same name, and stars Ahmed Marei.

Afaq
Produced in 1973. This documentary reflects the cultural life in modern Egypt.

Goyoush Al Shams
Produced in 1975, this documentary tries to capture the fresh sense of triumph in the eyes of the Egyptian soldiers after the 1973 war with Israel.

Korssy Tout Ankh Amun Al Zahaby
Produced in 1982, this docudrama is entitled to spread awareness of the ancient Egyptian heritage.

Al Ahramat Wama Kablaha
Produced in 1984, this docudrama is entitled to spread awareness of the ancient Egyptian heritage.

Ann Ramses Al Thany
Produced in 1986, this docudrama is entitled to spread awareness of the ancient Egyptian heritage.

The Tragedy of the Great House
The Tragedy of the Great House, also known as Akhenaten, was to be a historical epic on the reign of the Pharaoh Akhenaton. However, the film was not completed before Abdelsalam's death, owing to his insistence on Egyptian funding; he repeatedly rejected offers from foreign sources (including several generous ones from French backers), insisting that a film on Egyptian history be made exclusively with Egyptian money. Abdelsalam worked on this project for 10 years during which he made 4 rewrites of the script but never decided on a final version of the film and died before completing it, although most of the decorations, scenes, and costumes were finished.

Tribute
On 15 March 2015, Google celebrated his 85th birthday with a Google Doodle.

References

External links

San Francisco International Film Festival page
Bibliotheca Alexandrina museum page
Download The Night of Counting the Years at archive.org
The Cinema of North Africa and the Middle East Book
Taboo Memories, Diasporic Voices Book
Cinemalex page

Egyptian architects
Egyptian nationalists
Egyptian designers
1930 births
1986 deaths
People from Alexandria
Egyptian screenwriters
Egyptian film directors
20th-century screenwriters